Adhaeretor is a genus of bacteria from the family of Lacipirellulaceae with one known species, Adhaeretor mobilis.

References

Planctomycetota
Monotypic bacteria genera
Taxa described in 2022